Eagle Peak is a mountain in the Sierra Nevada of Mono County, California. The summit is set in Hoover Wilderness on land managed by Humboldt–Toiyabe National Forest. Eagle Peak is the highest peak on Buckeye Ridge. Other peaks on this ridge include Hunewill Peak and Victoria Peak. The first ascent of Eagle Peak was made September 1905 by George Davis, A. H. Sylvester, and Pearson Chapman of the United States Geological Survey.

Climate
According to the Köppen climate classification system, Eagle Peak is located in an alpine climate zone. Most weather fronts originate in the Pacific Ocean, and travel east toward the Sierra Nevada mountains. As fronts approach, they are forced upward by the peaks (orographic lift), causing moisture in the form of rain or snowfall to drop onto the range.

References

External links
 Weather forecast: Eagle Peak

Mountains of the Sierra Nevada (United States)
Mountains of Mono County, California
Mountains of Northern California
North American 3000 m summits
Humboldt–Toiyabe National Forest